The meridian 75° west of Greenwich is a line of longitude that extends from the North Pole across the Arctic Ocean, North America, the Atlantic Ocean, the Caribbean Sea, South America, the Pacific Ocean, the Southern Ocean, and Antarctica to the South Pole.

The mean solar time of this meridian is the base for the Eastern Time Zone (UTC-5 during standard time).

Stations belonging to the US National Weather Service begin submitting weather reports when the mean solar time of this meridian is 8:00 am. Report collection ends 30–40 minutes later and the data is used to create the day's weather forecast.

The 75th meridian west forms a great circle with the 105th meridian east.

From Pole to Pole
Starting at the North Pole and heading south to the South Pole, the 75th meridian west passes through:

{| class="wikitable plainrowheaders"
! scope="col" width="120" | Co-ordinates
! scope="col" width="125" | Country, territory or sea
! scope="col" | Notes
|-
| style="background:#b0e0e6;" | 
! scope="row" style="background:#b0e0e6;" | Arctic Ocean
| style="background:#b0e0e6;" |
|-
| 
! scope="row" | 
| Nunavut — Ellesmere Island
|-
| style="background:#b0e0e6;" | 
! scope="row" style="background:#b0e0e6;" | Baffin Bay
| style="background:#b0e0e6;" |
|-
| 
! scope="row" | 
| Nunavut — Baffin Island and Foley Island
|-valign="top"
| style="background:#b0e0e6;" | 
! scope="row" style="background:#b0e0e6;" | Foxe Basin
| style="background:#b0e0e6;" | Passing just to the east of Prince Charles Island, Nunavut,  (at )
|-
| 
! scope="row" | 
| Nunavut — Foxe Peninsula, Baffin Island
|-
| style="background:#b0e0e6;" | 
! scope="row" style="background:#b0e0e6;" | Hudson Strait
| style="background:#b0e0e6;" |
|-valign="top"
| 
! scope="row" | 
| Quebec Ontario — from 
|-valign="top"
| 
! scope="row" | 
|-
| style="background:#b0e0e6;" | 
! scope="row" style="background:#b0e0e6;" | Delaware Bay
| style="background:#b0e0e6;" |
|-valign="top"
| style="background:#b0e0e6;" | 
! scope="row" style="background:#b0e0e6;" | Atlantic Ocean
| style="background:#b0e0e6;" | Passing just east of the Delmarva Peninsula,  (at ) Passing just east of Conception Island,  (at ) Passing just west of Rum Cay,  (at )
|-
| 
! scope="row" | 
| Long Island
|-
| style="background:#b0e0e6;" | 
! scope="row" style="background:#b0e0e6;" | Atlantic Ocean
| style="background:#b0e0e6;" |
|-
| 
! scope="row" | 
|
|-valign="top"
| style="background:#b0e0e6;" | 
! scope="row" style="background:#b0e0e6;" | Caribbean Sea
| style="background:#b0e0e6;" | Passing just east of Navassa Island,  (at )
|-
| 
! scope="row" | 
|
|-valign="top"
| 
! scope="row" | 
| Loreto Region Ucayali Region — from  Huánuco Region — from  Pasco Region — from  Junín Region — from  Huancavelica Region — from  Ayacucho Region — from  Ica Region — from  Arequipa Region — from 
|-valign="top"
| style="background:#b0e0e6;" | 
! scope="row" style="background:#b0e0e6;" | Pacific Ocean
| style="background:#b0e0e6;" | Passing just west of Guafo Island,  (at ) Passing just east of Guamblín Island,  (at )
|-
| 
! scope="row" | 
|
|-
| style="background:#b0e0e6;" | 
! scope="row" style="background:#b0e0e6;" | Pacific Ocean
| style="background:#b0e0e6;" | Gulf of Penas
|-valign="top"
| 
! scope="row" | 
| Several islands in the Patagonic Archipelago, including Wager Island, Prat Island, Serrano Island, Knorr Island, Wellington Island, Angamos Island, Madre de Dios Island, Anafur Island, Doñas Island, Valenzuela Island, Dagigno Island, Agustin Island, Diego de Almagro Island, Jorge Montt Island, Ramirez Island and Contreras Island
|-
| style="background:#b0e0e6;" | 
! scope="row" style="background:#b0e0e6;" | Pacific Ocean
| style="background:#b0e0e6;" |
|-
| style="background:#b0e0e6;" | 
! scope="row" style="background:#b0e0e6;" | Southern Ocean
| style="background:#b0e0e6;" |
|-valign="top"
| 
! scope="row" | Antarctica
|-
|}

See also
74th meridian west
76th meridian west

References 

w075 meridian west